Alice, Where Art Thou? is a popular British parlour song of the Victorian era. It was composed by Joseph Ascher. The text was by Wellington Guernsey, although it is sometimes attributed to Alfred Bunn, who is best known for "I Dreamt I Dwelt in Marble Halls". It become a popular song, selling many copies of sheet music and featuring regularly as a standard in the music halls.

Usage
The phrase passed into popular usage for many decades. In the 1954 British film Svengali, it is heard several times as the song Trilby O'Ferrall sings badly before she is mesmerised by the title character into performing as a brilliant opera singer. The 1980s British television series Open All Hours features a brass band version of the tune as its title music.

References

Bibliography
 Roy Newsome: Brass Roots: A Hundred Years of Brass Bands and Their Music, 1836-1936 (London: Routledge, 2019).
 Eric Partridge: A Dictionary of Catch Phrases (London: Routledge, 2003).

1861 songs
British songs
Music hall songs